David Ratcliffe (born 9 March 1957) is a former professional footballer. Born in England, he represented Australia at international level.

Career
Born in Dewsbury, Ratcliffe joined Bradford City as an amateur in July 1972, joining the first-team in March 1975. He made 28 league appearances, scoring once, and two FA Cup appearances, before leaving the club in June 1978. He later played in Australia for Brisbane City, St. George, Sydney Olympic, Wollongong City and Mount Pritchard.

He also earned 21 international caps for Australia between 1982 and 1986.

He managed Wollongong City, Sydney Olympic, and Sydney United in the Australian National Soccer League.

Sources

References

Australian soccer players
Australia international soccer players
Australian people of English descent
Australian expatriate soccer players
National Soccer League (Australia) players
1957 births
Living people
Association football defenders
English footballers
Bradford City A.F.C. players
English Football League players
Brisbane City FC players
St George FC players
Sydney Olympic FC players
Wollongong Wolves FC players
Mounties Wanderers FC players
Expatriate soccer managers in Australia
Sydney United 58 FC managers
Sydney Olympic FC managers
Australian soccer coaches